New York's 70th State Assembly district is one of the 150 districts in the New York State Assembly. It has been represented by Inez Dickens since 2017.

Geography
District 73 is in Manhattan. The district includes portions of El Barrio, Hamilton Heights, Harlem, and Morningside Heights.

Recent election results

2022

2020

2018

2016

2014

2012

2010

References

70